This article contains information about the literary events and publications of 1635.

Events
February 22 – In Paris, the Académie française is founded.
May 6 – The King's Men perform Othello at the Blackfriars Theatre in London.
July 16 – Birth of René Descartes' daughter, Francine, at Deventer.
August 23 – A few days before his death, beset by family troubles, Lope de Vega writes his last poems.
Ottoman Turkish poet Nef'i is garroted in the grounds of the Topkapı Palace in Istanbul for his satirical verses.
Wallachian statesman Udriște Năsturel pays lyrical tribute to Prince Matei Basarab, his brother-in-law. Though composed and published in Slavonic, this is the first blason in Romanian literature, and by some accounts the first-ever Romanian poem.

New books

Prose
Sir Kenelm Digby – A Conference with a Lady about choice of a Religion
Thomas Heywood – The Hierarchy of the Blessed Angels
Tirso de Molina – Deleitar aprovechando
John Selden – Mare Clausum

Drama
Francis Bristowe – King Free-Will
Richard Brome – The Sparagus Garden
Pierre Corneille – Médée
William Davenant
News from Plymouth
The Platonick Lovers
The Temple of Love (masque)
Pedro Calderón de la Barca – Life is a Dream (La vida es sueño)
Isaac de Benserade – Cléopâtre
Henry Glapthorne
The Hollander
The Lady Mother (attr.)
Richard Lovelace – The Scholars
Jean Mairet – Le Marc-Antoine, ou la Cléopâtre
Thomas Nabbes – Hannibal and Scipio
Jean Rotrou – La Bague de l'oubli
Joseph Rutter – The Shepherd's Holiday performed at Court and published
James Shirley – The Coronation, The Lady of Pleasure performed; The Traitor published

Poetry
See 1635 in poetry

Births
January 13 – Philipp Jakob Spener, German theologian (died 1706)
February 1 – Marquard Gude, German classicist and archeologist (died 1689)
February 21 – Thomas Flatman, English poet and miniaturist (died 1688)
June 3 – Philippe Quinault, French dramatist and librettist (died 1688)
September 20 (baptism) – Thomas Sprat, English theologian and bishop (died 1713)

Deaths
March – Thomas Randolph, English poet and dramatist (born 1605)
April 7 – Leonard Digges, English poet (born 1588)
April 25 – Alessandro Tassoni, Italian poet (born 1565)
July 28 – Richard Corbet (Richard Corbett), English poet and bishop (born 1582)
August (burial) – Richard Whitbourne, English Newfoundland colonist and writer (born 1561)
August 27 – Lope de Vega, Spanish dramatist and poet (born 1562)
October 18 – Jean de Schelandre, French poet (born c. 1585)
November 8 – Aodh Buidhe Mac an Bhaird, Irish poet, historian and friar (born c. 1593)
November 25 – Dr John Hall, English medical writer and son-in-law of William Shakespeare (born 1575)

References

 
Years of the 17th century in literature